Balmoral is an unincorporated community in Hamilton County, Tennessee, United States.

Notes

Unincorporated communities in Hamilton County, Tennessee
Unincorporated communities in Tennessee